Gong Maoxin and Zhang Ze were the defending champions but chose not to defend their title.

Mikhail Elgin and Denis Istomin won the title after defeating Nam Ji-sung and Song Min-kyu 3–6, 6–4, [10–6] in the final.

Seeds

Draw

References

External links
 Main draw

Liuzhou Open - Men's Doubles